Guzhuang is a railway station on the Taiwan Railways Administration South-link line located in Dawu Township, Taitung County, Taiwan.

History
The station was opened for passengers on 5 October 1992. Over the years due to the low utilization of the station by passengers, the station was downgraded into a signal station in 2017.

Trivia
Guzhuang is the second least used TRA station, according to the TRA report on Volume of Passenger & Freight Traffic announced in 2015, 281 passengers boarding and 470 passengers alighting.

See also
 List of railway stations in Taiwan

References

1992 establishments in Taiwan
Railway signal stations in Taiwan
Railway stations in Taitung County
Railway stations opened in 1992
Railway stations served by Taiwan Railways Administration